The United States Post Office in Fairhope, Alabama is a historic United States Post Office building built in 1932, in the Italian Renaissance Revival architectural style.  It currently houses the offices of the Fairhope Courier.  The building was listed on the National Register of Historic Places in 1988.

See also 
List of United States post offices

References 

National Register of Historic Places in Baldwin County, Alabama
Government buildings completed in 1932
Italian Renaissance Revival architecture in the United States
Fairhope